General elections were held in Honduras on 27 November 1993. Voters cast a single ballot for both the presidential and Congressional election.

Results

References

Bibliography
Kirk S. Bowman: “Taming the tiger in Honduras.” LASA forum 30, 1:9-12 (spring 1999). 1999.
Rodolfo Cerdas Cruz: “Political parties and party systems.” Sieder, Rachel, ed. 1996. Central America: fragile transition. London: Institute of Latin American Studies, University of London. 1996.
Margaret E. Crahan: “Honduras: elecciones generales, 28 de noviembre de 1993.” Boletin electoral latinoamericano X:19-30 (julio-diciembre 1993).
Elections in the Americas - A Data Handbook Volume 1: North America, Central America, and the Caribbean. Edited by Dieter Nohlen. 2005.
Ramón Izaguirre: “Análisis del caso de Honduras.” Sistemas de elecciones parlamentarias y su relación con la gobernabilidad democrática. 2000. San José: Instituto Interamericano de Derechos Humanos. 2000.
Thomas M. Leonard: “The quest for Central American democracy since 1945.” Assessing democracy in Latin America. 1998. Boulder: Westview Press. 1998.
Tim L. Merrill (ed.): Honduras: a country study. Washington, D.C.: Federal Research Division, Library of Congress. 1995.
Julio César Navarro: “Los mitos del voto separado en las elecciones de 1997.” Revista política de Honduras 1:183-193 (January 1999). 1999.
Political handbook of the world 1993. New York, 1994.
Mario Posas “Indisputable vote against neoliberalism.” Envio (English edition) 12, 150:14-17 (January 1994). 1994.
Mario Posas “Honduras: elecciones generales.” Espacios 1:69-74 (julio-septiembre 1994). 1994
Mark B. Rosenberg: “Honduras: democratization and the role of the armed forces.” Constructing democratic governance: Latin America and the Caribbean in the 1990s. 1996. Baltimore: Johns Hopkins University Press. Part IV. 1996.
Milady Sabillón Pineda de Flores: La mujer en los partidos políticos. Tegucigalpa: Alin. 1998.
Rachel Sieder: Elecciones y democratización en Honduras desde 1980. Tegucigalpa: Editorial Universitaria. 1998.
Mark P. Sullivan: “Government and politics.” Merrill, Tim L., ed. 1995. Honduras: a country study. Washington, D.C.: Federal Research Division, Library of Congress. 1995.
Michelle M. Taylor: “When electoral and party institutions interact to produce caudillo politics: the case of Honduras.” Electoral studies 15, 3:327-337 (August 1996). 1996.
Michelle M. Taylor-Robinson: “La política hondureña y las elecciones de 2005.” Revista de ciencia política 26, 1:114-124 (2006). 2006.

Elections in Honduras
1993 in Honduras
Honduras
Presidential elections in Honduras
November 1993 events in North America